KNBY is a radio station airing an Oldies format licensed to Newport, Arkansas, broadcasting on 1280 kHz AM.  The station serves the areas of Newport, Arkansas, Searcy, Arkansas, and Batesville, Arkansas, and is owned by Newport Broadcasting Company.

References

External links

Oldies radio stations in the United States
NBY